Mo Ranch is a Presbyterian conference center for summer camps, retreats, family reunions that is located in unincorporated Kerr County, Texas.

History
The Ranch is named for Daniel J. Moran, who was chairman of Continental Oil Company (later to become Conoco, Inc.). He owned the  ranch from 1935 until his death in 1948; Presbyterians purchased the ranch in 1949, the year after his death, for $562,500; Mrs. Moran then gave a gift back to the church of $50,000. Eventually the State of Texas bought  of the ranch from the Presbyterians, and later expanded that portion with additional purchase of adjacent land. That land is now the Kerr County Wildlife Management Area, administered by Texas Parks & Wildlife.

By 2019 the Mo Ranch camp organization began doing off-site camping programs in the Rio Grande Valley region; historically many residents there chose not to travel to Kerr County for the camp as some members of families lacked immigration visas and therefore could be detained at in-country immigration checkpoints set up in the region.

References

External links
 Mo Ranch HomePage

Buildings and structures in Kerr County, Texas
Summer camps in Texas